Kontakt is Native Instruments' flagship software sampler and one of the leading software sampling applications on the market.

Overview

Kontakt
First introduced in 2002, Kontakt combines sampler functionality with elements of synthesis and effects. Kontakt works as either a stand-alone application or as a plug-in on both Mac and Windows platforms. The software sampler is one of the leading applications of its type in the market.

Kontakt Player
Kontakt Player is a free, feature-limited version of Kontakt that functions as a virtual instrument for sample libraries, often with a specialized GUI with graphics and controls specific to that library, without the expense and extensive editing capabilities of the full version of Kontakt. Native Instruments manufactures numerous virtual instruments that utilize the Kontakt Player.

3rd Party Libraries
Many third-party manufacturers program software sample libraries, and Kontakt features the Kontakt Script Processor (KSP) and Creator Tools to help users of the software and sample library developers create their own instruments that utilize the Kontakt sampling and synthesis engine. By utilizing KSP, sample library developers can create instruments that can be played and controlled via Kontakt. Third-party sample manufacturers normally bundle their libraries with a customized version of a sample player optimized for that library.

Kontakt Hub 
Kontakt Hub is a website that offers third-party sample libraries designed for use with Kontakt. It provides a wide variety of sample libraries for different genres and styles. Kontakt Hub also offers a service called "Submit Your Library," which allows sample library developers to submit their products for consideration to be featured on the website. This service provides developers with access to a large audience of potential customers.

References

Native Instruments
Samplers (musical instrument)
Software synthesizers